Fabrice "Fabe" (born in 1971 Paris, France) is a French rapper from Barbès, a district of Paris. He is one of the founders of Scred Connexion, an underground French rap group. He started rapping around 1991 releasing his first work as early as 1995. He is mostly known for his thought-provoking and clever use of lyrics. During the French Riots, he was cited in a petition against seven rap musicians and bands, who were alleged to have incited racism and the riots themselves. The claims were dropped shortly afterwards. He retired from the music scene in 2000 and left to study theology in Quebec.

Discography
 Befa surprend ses frères (1995)
 "Hip-Hop Soul Party 2" (1996)
 "Hip-Hop Soul Party 3" (1996)
 Le Fond et la forme (1997)
 Détournement de son (1998)
 La Rage de dire (2000)

Scred Connexion (Koma, Mokless, Haroun, Morad and Fabe)
 Bouteille de gaz (1999) 
 Du Mal A S'confier (2002) 
 "Le Poids des Mots" (2011)

External links
 French MP Blames Rappers
 French Lawmakers Accuse Rap Groups Of Inciting Riots

French rappers
French people of Martiniquais descent
Martiniquais musicians
Black French musicians
Living people
1971 births